Rayanne Cristine dos Santos Melo Machado (born 16 June 1994) is a Brazilian footballer who plays as a defender for Flamengo and the Brazil national team.

International career
Machado made her debut for the Brazil national team on 29 July 2018 against Japan in the 2018 Tournament of Nations.

References

1994 births
Living people
Women's association football defenders
Brazilian women's footballers
Brazil women's international footballers
Sociedade Esportiva Kindermann players
S.C. Braga (women's football) players
Brazilian expatriate women's footballers
Brazilian expatriate sportspeople in Portugal
Expatriate women's footballers in Portugal
Footballers from Rio de Janeiro (city)
Campeonato Brasileiro de Futebol Feminino Série A1 players
Clube de Regatas do Flamengo (women) players